The Claxton Shield was the premier baseball competition in Australia, first held in 1934 and last held in 2010. The Claxton Shield is also the name of the trophy awarded to the champion team, and has also been awarded to winners of both the original Australian Baseball League (ABL) and the International Baseball League of Australia (IBLA). The current version of the Australian Baseball League uses the Claxton Shield as its championship trophy in the same way as its predecessor of the same name did.

There had been interstate baseball tournaments held prior to the start of the Claxton Shield. The first was held in Hobart in 1910, won by New South Wales defeating Victoria and hosts Tasmania. New South Wales repeated the feat in 1912 in Melbourne when they won again, this time with the addition of South Australia. None were held regularly though, and they did not always involve all baseball–playing states. In 1934 Norrie Claxton was the principal driver of an annual national competition, and donated the shield to be awarded to the champions. Though it was originally intended to be permanently held by the first team to win in three consecutive years, when South Australia won the first three tournaments all participating states agreed that it should be a perpetual shield, and named it the Claxton Shield in honour of Norrie Claxton.

The Victoria Aces were the last team to win the shield under the Claxton Shield format, having won the 2010 tournament by defeating South Australia two games to nil in the final series. It was the eighteenth time the Aces had won the shield, and the twenty second time it had been won by a Victorian team—the most by any state—including three times by the Waverley / Melbourne Reds and once by the Melbourne Monarchs. The Melbourne Aces currently hold the shield after overcoming the Adelaide Giants in the 2019–20 Australian Baseball League season. It was the Melbourne Aces first ABL title and twenty-third time a Victorian team has won the Claxton Shield. Though city-based teams have competed for the Claxton Shield in some seasons, including under the current ABL format, the name engraved on the shield is that of the winning state; for the 2010–11 ABL season won by the Perth Heat, "West Australia 2011" was engraved.

Champions

Claxton Shield

Australian Baseball League (1989–1999)

International Baseball League of Australia

Australian Baseball League (2010–present)

Championships by state

See also 
 Australian Baseball Federation
 Australian Baseball League (2010–Current)
 Australian Baseball League (1989–1999)
 International Baseball League of Australia

References

Bibliography

External links
Australian Baseball Federation official website

Australia sport-related lists